Lake County Forest Preserves (also called Lake County Forest Preserve District, or LCFPD) is a governmental organization that purchases land and oversees the use of such public open-space in Lake County, Illinois.  It is a member of Chicago Wilderness. 

The board of directors is also the board of Lake County.  The directors are voted into office, and represent their respective districts in Lake County.

Introduction 
The mission of the Lake County Forest Preserves is preservation, restoration, education and recreation. They protect about 31,000 acres of natural land and are the second largest Forest preserve service in Illinois. The Lake County Forest Preserve has a set 100 year plan. Their goal for this 100 year plan is to keep natural land safe and restore it. They want residents to take great pride in forest preserves, that their community provides.

History 
Ethel Untermyer is considered the founder of Lake County Forest Preserves. Ethel and her son went exploring in the woods one day, in 1957. She was new to the lake county area and wanted to explore. She asked her friend where the nearest forest preserve was, and Ethel was shocked to find that there was none. She then organized a countywide public vote to create a Lake County Forest preserve district. Many people did not take into account of what she was doing. She kept telling people in her community about forest preserves and slowly gained support from many people. At this time Lake County just barely had 300,000 people and even then, people noticed the lack of natural land. By election day in November 1958, a handful of public support was shown in the community. The public vote passed with a surprising 60 percent of votes. As of then, Lake County Forest Preserve District was legally established in circuit court. A committee of citizens was then formed, with Ethel as its chair. In 1961 the first forest preserve opened in Lake County; Van Patten Woods in Wadsworth.

100-Year Plan 
Lake County Forest Preserve envisions in 100 years that Lake County will be a healthy and thriving landscape with preserved natural lands, waters and cultural aspects. Residents will be able to take great honor in how their forest preserves help their communities. The healthy communities will thrive, and continue to through future generations that will protect these resources.

Recreation 
Lake County Forest Preserve community provides many activities for the public and holds many events. The activities include; Biking on trails, paddling, dog parks, fishing, horseback riding, swimming, winter sports, and many more. There are many ways to get involved and create a healthy environment for many years to come. They want to provide a safe place for people to come and be with nature.

Preservation 
The preservation foundation partners with Lake County Forest Preserves. It helps with the growth and development of the regions natural land. They fund projects that might otherwise go unfunded. When you support the Preservation Foundation, you provide your Lake County Forest Preserves to exist, grow and thrive.

Properties 

Adlai E. Stevenson Historic Home, National Historic Landmark 4/23/2014
Almond Marsh
Bonner Heritage Farm
Brae Loch Golf Club
Buffalo Creek
Captain Daniel Wright Woods
Countryside Golf Club
Cuba Marsh
Curt Teich Postcard Archives
Des Plaines River Trail
Dog Sled Area
Duck Farm
Fort Hill Trail
Fort Sheridan Forest Preserve
Fourth Lake
Fox River Preserve & Marina
Gander Mountain
Grainger Woods
Grant Woods
Grassy Lake
Greenbelt Forest Preserve
Greenbelt Cultural Center
Half Day
Hastings Lake
Heron Creek
Independence Grove & Visitors Center
Lake Carina
Lake County Discovery Museum
Lake County History Archives
Lakewood
Lyons Woods
McDonald Woods
Middlefork Savanna
Millennium Trail
Nippersink
Oak Spring Road Canoe Launch (Wilmot Woods)
Old School
Prairie Wolf
Raven Glen
Rollins Savanna
Route 60 Canoe Launch
Edward L. Ryerson Conservation Area & Welcome Center
Singing Hills
Spring Bluff (This preserve is part of the bi-state Chiwaukee Illinois Beach Lake Plain, a Ramsar Convention wetland)
Sun Lake
ThunderHawk Golf Club
Van Patten Woods
Wadsworth Road Canoe Launch
Waukegan Savanna
Wetlands Research Project
Wilmot Woods
Wright Woods

References 

Further reading: 

Abderholden, Frank. "Lake County adds to roster of 'most pristine and sensitive'

    areas protected as Illinois Nature Preserves." Chicago Tribune, 16 May

    2019, p. 1. Chicago Tribune, www.chicagotribune.com/suburbs/

    lake-county-news-sun/

    ct-lns-forest-preserve-dedication-nature-st-0515-story.html. Accessed 13

    Oct. 2019. 

"Lake County Forest Preserves." Lake County Nature, Lake County, www.lcfpd.org/

    foia/. Accessed 13 Oct. 2019. 

Mikus, Kim. "What Lake County Forest Preserves teams do behind scenes to make

    visits enjoyable for you." Daily Herald, 7 June 2019, p. 1. Daily Herald,

    www.dailyherald.com/entlife/20190607/

    what-lake-county-forest-preserves-teams-do-behind-scenes-to-make-visits-enjoyable

    -for-you. Accessed 13 Oct. 2019. 

"20 things you might not know about the Lake County Forest Preserves." Daily

    Herald, 24 Jan. 2019, p. 1. Daily Herald, www.dailyherald.com/news/

    20190124/20-things-you-might-not-know-about-the-lake-county-forest-preserves-.

    Accessed 13 Oct. 2019. 

Nature conservation organizations based in the United States
Ecological restoration
Nature reserves in Illinois
Forests of Illinois